Van der Boom is a Dutch surname. Notable people with the surname include:

Claire van der Boom (born 1983), Australian actress
Jeroen van der Boom (born 1972), Dutch singer
Laura Vanderboom, Character from Rusty Lake

Surnames of Dutch origin